"Talk to Me" is a song by American recording artists Brandy, Ray J and Willie Norwood. It was written by Scott "Shavoni" Parker and Tommy Niblack, while production was overseen by the former. Based on the American reality series Brandy and Ray J: A Family Business which aired on the VH1 network between the years of 2010 and 2011, it was released by Saguaro Road Records as the first single from the A Family Business soundtrack which accompanied the series' second season.

Critical reception
"Talk to Me" garnered generally negative reviews from music critics. Jon O'Brien from AllMusic found the ballad schmaltzy and wrote that it is the "type of gloopy sub-Disney ballad you'd have expected to hear on Brandy's late-'90s Cinderella remake." Chuck Campbell from the Scripps Howard News Service, writing for The Telegraph Encore, declared "Talk to Me" a "generic slow song that degenerates into a wail-off among the three singers."

Formats and track listings

Charts

Weekly charts

References

External links
 BrandyAndRayJMusic.com — official site

2010 songs
2010 singles
Brandy Norwood songs
Ray J songs
Songs written by Ray J
2010s ballads
Contemporary R&B ballads
Soul ballads